Budcat Creations, LLC was an American video game developer based in Iowa City, Iowa, United States and was a wholly owned subsidiary of Activision, though they formerly had partnerships with Electronic Arts and Majesco Entertainment. They were largely responsible for porting titles to non-target consoles. They had worked on a number of blockbuster gaming franchises, among them Guitar Hero, Madden NFL, and Medal of Honor. They have also produced a few original titles, including Blast Works: Build, Trade, Destroy and The New York Times Crosswords.

History
Budcat was founded by Jason Andersen and Jonah Stich who met on the precursor to AOL, via a shared interest in the Apple IIgs.  A few months into the companies initial year, Isaac Burns joined as a partner.  Isaac, and Jason met in High School, in their hometown of Iowa City, IA.

The company went on to produce a string of sports titles for EA over the next five years, including entries in the NASCAR Thunder, NHL Hockey series, and FIFA Manager series, as well as the PlayStation 2 version of Psychonauts for Majesco Entertainment.

In 2005, Budcat moved to its ultimate location in Iowa City in order to facilitate expanding their offices. Budcat worked in partnership with Majesco Entertainment, Electronic Arts, and Activision on multiple titles before being purchased by Activision Blizzard on November 10, 2008, where they mostly worked on the Guitar Hero brand.

Budcat Creations was shuttered by Activision Blizzard on November 16, 2010.

Games

References

External links

Defunct video game companies of the United States
Video game development companies
Video game companies established in 2000
Video game companies disestablished in 2010
Defunct companies based in Iowa
Former Vivendi subsidiaries
Defunct Activision subsidiaries
2000 establishments in Iowa
2010 disestablishments in Iowa